Sumner Locke Elliott (17 October 191724 June 1991) was an Australian (later American) novelist and playwright.

Biography
Elliott was born in Sydney to the writer Sumner Locke and the journalist Henry Logan Elliott. His mother died of eclampsia one day after his birth. Elliott was raised by his aunts, who had a fierce custody battle over him, fictionalised in Elliott's autobiographical novel, Careful, He Might Hear You. Elliott was educated at Cranbrook School in Bellevue Hill, Sydney.

World War II
Elliott became an actor and writer with the Doris Fitton's The Independent Theatre Ltd. He was drafted into the Australian Army in 1942, but instead of being posted overseas, he worked as a clerk in Australia. He used these experiences as the inspiration for his controversial play, Rusty Bugles. The play toured extensively throughout Australia and achieved the notoriety of being closed down for obscenity by the Chief Secretary's Office.

However, Rusty Bugles''' place in the history of Australian theatre rests on more than notoriety. Mac is a memorable character in the play, and in the first production, Frank O'Donnell transformed audiences' understanding of the typical Australian 'bludger' or 'scrounger'. To the men in his unit, he appeared a winner even when he was losing, but with the discovery of his wife's infidelity, his fragility becomes apparent.

Television
Elliott moved to the United States in 1948, where he ranked in the pantheon of leading playwrights during the Golden Age of live television dramas, writing more than 30 original plays and numerous adaptations for such shows as The Philco Television Playhouse, Kraft Television Theatre, Studio One and Playhouse 90. He also wrote a play, Buy Me Blue Ribbons, which had a short run on Broadway.

In 1955, he obtained United States citizenship and did not return to Australia until 1974. His TV play The Grey Nurse Said Nothing aired on TV in the US and Australia.

Books
Elliott's best known novel, Careful, He Might Hear You, won the 1963 Miles Franklin Award and was turned into a film in 1983.

Private life
As a gay man during a time when this was socially disapproved of, Elliott was uncomfortable with his sexuality. He kept it secret until nearly the end of his life before coming out in his book Fairyland. Because of these fears, Elliott had affairs but never had any stable relationships.

Death
He died of colon cancer aged 73 in New York City in 1991.

Bibliography

NovelsCareful, He Might Hear You (1963)Some Doves and Pythons (1966)Edens Lost (1969)The Man Who Got Away (1972)Going (1975)Water Under the Bridge (1977)Rusty Bugles (1980)Signs of Life (1981)About Tilly Beamis (1985)Waiting for Childhood (1987)Fairyland (1990)

Short storiesRadio Days (1993)

PlaysStorm (1931) (one-act)Interval (1939)The Cow Jumped Over the Moon (1939)The Little Sheep Run Fast (1940)Goodbye to the Music (1942)Your Obedient Servant (1943)The Invisible Circus (1946)Wicked Is the Vine (first Australian play to be televised in US)Rusty Bugles (1948)Buy Me Blue Ribbons (1951)John Murray Anderson's Almanac (1953)

TV plays
"Wicked id the Vine"
"The Crater"
"Beloved Stranger" (1955), for Goodyear Television Playhouse (1955)
"The Thin Air" (1952), "We Were Children" (1952), "Before I Wake" (1953) and "Friday the 13th" (1954) for The Philco Television Playhouse"The King and Mrs. Candle," for Producers' Showcase (1955)
"Whereabouts Unknown," for The Kaiser-Aluminum Hour (1957)
"Babe in the Woods" (1957) and "Love at Fourth Sight" (1957) for Studio One 
"The Count of Monte Cristo" (1958) and "The Prisoner of Zenda" (1961) for Dupont Show of the Month"Daisy! Daisy!" (1956) and "You and Me... and the Gatepost!" (1956) for Playwrights '56"I Heard You Calling Me" (1961), for Way Out"Mrs. Gilling and the Skyscraper" (1957) for The Alcoa Hour"Wish on the Moon," for The Philco Television Playhouse (1953).

Radio plays
"Wicked is the Vine" – Lux Radio Theatre'' (1947)

References

External links
Obituary, The New York Times, June 26, 1991

Sumner Locke Elliott Australian theatre credits at AusStage

1917 births
1991 deaths
Australian emigrants to the United States
Australian people of English descent
American gay writers
Australian LGBT novelists
Miles Franklin Award winners
Patrick White Award winners
20th-century Australian novelists
20th-century American novelists
20th-century American dramatists and playwrights
American LGBT dramatists and playwrights
American LGBT novelists
American male novelists
American male dramatists and playwrights
20th-century Australian male writers
Australian male novelists
20th-century American male writers
20th-century Australian LGBT people
Australian gay writers
Australian LGBT dramatists and playwrights